The 1942 Maryland gubernatorial election was held on November 3, 1942. Incumbent Democrat Herbert O'Conor defeated Republican nominee Theodore McKeldin with 52.55% of the vote.

General election

Candidates
Herbert O'Conor, Democratic
Theodore McKeldin, Republican

Results

References

1942
Maryland
Gubernatorial